Phil Earle is a British children's author.

In 2013, The Guardian described Heroic as "a unique, challenging and engaging read".

In 2016, Earle was appointed as the 13th online Writer in Residence for BookTrust, a children's reading charity.

At the 2022 British Book Awards, When the Sky Falls won Children's Book of the Year. In 2022, The Times called While the Storm Rages "a fresh take on wartime evacuees".

Personal life
Earle is married to Lou; they have five children, two dogs, "a dragon called Baz", and live in West Yorkshire.

Publications
Being Billy, 2012
Heroic, 2013
Demolition Dad
When the Sky Falls, Andersen Press, 2021
While the Storm Rages, 2022

References

External links
 Official website

Living people
21st-century British novelists
British children's writers
Year of birth missing (living people)